Sir Thomas Sutherland,  ( 16 August 1834 – 1 January 1922) was a Scottish banker and politician, initially elected to represent the Liberal Party and then as a Liberal Unionist.  He founded The Hongkong and Shanghai Banking Corporation which was the founder member of HSBC Group and directed the P&O Company.

Early life
Sutherland was the son of Robert Sutherland and Christian Webster of Aberdeen. He was educated at Aberdeen University.

Career
Sutherland got his start clerking in the London office of the Peninsular and Oriental Steam Navigation Company (P&O). Soon after, P&O promoted Sutherland to superintendent, assigning him to British Hong Kong to manage the firm's Asian operation. 
In 1863 he became the first chairman of the Hong Kong and Whampoa Dock. In order to help finance the burgeoning trade between China and Europe, and explore the potential for China—United States trade, Sutherland established The Hongkong and Shanghai Banking Corporation in 1865 and became its first vice-chairman.

He was appointed member of the Legislative Council of Hong Kong from 1865 to 1866. In 1872 he was appointed Managing Director of P & O.

In November 1884, Sutherland was elected at a by-election as the Member of Parliament (MP) for Greenock. A Liberal, he was re-elected in 1885, but when the Liberals split over Irish Home Rule he joined the breakaway Liberal Unionist Party. He was re-elected as a Liberal Unionist in 1886, but lost the seat at the 1892 general election. However, he was reinstated when his opponent was unseated on petition, and held the seat until he stood down at the 1900 general election.

Personal life
In 1880, Sutherland married Alice Macnaught. She was the daughter of Rev. John Macnaught of Trinity Church, Conduit Street, London, England. The couple had two sons, and a daughter, Helen Christian Sutherland (1881–1965), known as an art patron; one of the sons, Eric Macnaught Sutherland, died in the Second Boer War, the other son, Thomas Leslie Macnaught Sutherland, died during World War I. In 1920, his wife Alice died.

Death and legacy
In 1922, Sutherland died in London, England. 
Sutherland Street in Sheung Wan, Hong Kong was named after him.

References

External links

Electric Scotland – Sir Thomas Sutherland

HSBC people
History of CK Hutchison Holdings
Knights Grand Cross of the Order of St Michael and St George
1834 births
1922 deaths
Scottish bankers
Alumni of the University of Aberdeen
Politics of Inverclyde
Scottish company founders
Members of the Legislative Council of Hong Kong
Scottish Liberal Party MPs
UK MPs 1880–1885
UK MPs 1885–1886
Liberal Unionist Party MPs for Scottish constituencies
UK MPs 1886–1892
UK MPs 1892–1895
UK MPs 1895–1900
 Hong Kong businesspeople
Hong Kong people of Scottish descent